Ilybius discicolle is a species of beetle in family Dytiscidae. It is endemic to Ethiopia.

Ilybius discicolle was formerly called Agabus discicollis.

References

Endemic fauna of Ethiopia
Ilybius
Insects of Ethiopia
Taxonomy articles created by Polbot
Beetles described in 1882
Taxobox binomials not recognized by IUCN